The United Kingdom of Great Britain and Northern Ireland competed as Great Britain at the 1964 Winter Olympics in Innsbruck, Austria.

British luger Kazimierz Kay-Skrzypecki was killed on the Olympic course two weeks before the games.

Medallists

Alpine skiing

Men

Men's slalom

Women

Biathlon

Men

 1 Two minutes added per miss.

Bobsleigh

Nash and Dixon won the race after being loaned an axle bolt by the Italian bobsledder Eugenio Monti, who finished third but would be given the first De Coubertin Medal for sportsmanship.

Cross-country skiing

Men

Men's 4 × 10 km relay

Figure skating

Men

Women

Luge

British luger Kazimierz Kay-Skrzypecki was killed on the Olympic course two weeks before the games.

Men

Speed skating

Men

References
Official Olympic Reports
International Olympic Committee results database
 Olympic Winter Games 1964, full results by sports-reference.com

Nations at the 1964 Winter Olympics
1964 Winter Olympics
Winter Olympics
Winter sports in the United Kingdom